Éric Prodon is the defending champion.
João Sousa won the title, defeating Prodon 7–6(7–5), 6–4 in the final.

Seeds

Draw

Finals

Top half

Bottom half

References
 Main Draw
 Qualifying Draw

Tampere Open - Singles
2012 Singles